Paul McQuilken (born 22 June 1981) is a Scottish footballer who began his career playing with junior side Kilsyth Rangers. Thereafter he signed 'senior' with Dumbarton where he played regularly for three seasons.

References

1981 births
Scottish footballers
Dumbarton F.C. players
Scottish Football League players
Living people
Association football forwards